Hydrodytinae is a subfamily of predaceous diving beetles in the family Dytiscidae. There are at least two genera and four described species in Hydrodytinae.

Genera and Species
These genera and species belong to the subfamily Hydrodytinae:
 Genus Hydrodytes K. B. Miller, 2001 (North America and the Neotropics)
 Species Hydrodytes dodgei (Young, 1989) (North America)
 Species Hydrodytes inaciculatus (Guignot, 1957) (Neotropics)
 Species Hydrodytes opalinus (Zimmermann, 1921) (Neotropics)
 Genus Microhydrodytes K.B. Miller, 2002 (Neotropics)
 Species Microhydrodytes elachistus K.B. Miller, 2002 (Neotropics)

References

Further reading

 
 
 
 
 

Dytiscidae